Opor ayam is an Indonesian dish from Central Java consisting of chicken cooked in coconut milk. The spice mixture (bumbu) includes galangal, lemongrass, cinnamon, tamarind juice, palm sugar, coriander, cumin, candlenut, garlic, shallot, and pepper. Opor ayam is also a popular dish for lebaran or Eid ul-Fitr, usually eaten with ketupat and sambal goreng ati (beef liver in sambal).

Opor ayam is a food that is very well known in Indonesia. This cuisine has been widely known in other regions, almost all parts of Indonesia.
Opor ayam is actually boiled chicken which is given thick condiment from coconut milk which is added with various spices such as lemongrass, kencur, and so on.  In Javanese tradition, the celebration of Lebaran is usually made festive by making ketupat which is served with eggs and fried beef liver in sambal.

See also

 Opor
 List of chicken dishes
 List of Indonesian soups

References

External links
 Opor Ayam Recipe from Tasty Indonesian Food

Javanese cuisine
Indonesian curries
Southeast Asian curries
Indonesian chicken dishes
Indonesian soups
Indonesian stews
Foods containing coconut